Pieter Jacob (P. J.) Cosijn (29 November 1840, Rijswijk – 26 August 1899, Leiden) was a late 19th-century Dutch scholar of Anglo-Saxon literature. His important work on Beowulf was edited by Rolf Bremmer.

Cosijn became a member of the Royal Netherlands Academy of Arts and Sciences in 1877.

References

External links
 

1840 births
1899 deaths
Dutch medievalists
Academic staff of Leiden University
Linguists from the Netherlands
Members of the Royal Netherlands Academy of Arts and Sciences
People from Rijswijk
Rectors of universities in the Netherlands
Utrecht University alumni